Rona is a remote, uninhabited Scottish island in the North Atlantic. Rona is often referred to as North Rona to distinguish it from South Rona (another small island, in the Inner Hebrides). It is included within the historic county of Ross-shire.

More isolated than St Kilda, it is the most remote island in the British Isles ever to have been inhabited on a long-term basis. It is also the closest neighbour to the Faroe Islands. Because of the island's remote location and small area, it is omitted from many maps of the United Kingdom.

Etymology
The English language qualifier North is sometimes used to distinguish the island from Rona off Skye.

History
Rona is said to have been the residence of Saint Ronan in the eighth century and he is said to have been the first inhabitant.  A tiny early Christian oratory which may be as early as this date, built of unmortared stone, survives virtually complete on the island – the best-preserved structure of this type in Scotland.  A number of simple cross-slabs of early medieval date are preserved within the structure, probably the grave-markers of Dark Age monks or hermits from Scotland or Ireland.  The island continued to be inhabited until the entire population of thirty died shortly after 1685 after an infestation by rats, probably the black rat (Rattus rattus), which reached the island after a shipwreck. The rats raided the food stocks of barley meal and it is possible the inhabitants starved to death, although plague may have been a contributory factor. This occurred in a year in which it is reported that no further ships reached the isolated island to supply or trade. The rats themselves eventually starved to death, the huge swells the island experiences preventing their hunting along the rocky shores.

It was resettled, but again depopulated by around 1695 in some sort of boating tragedy, after which it remained home to a succession of shepherds and their families. It had a population of nine in 1764.

"On one occasion ... a crew from Ness in Lewis had their boat wrecked in landing at Sula Sgeir in the month of June, and lived on the island for several weeks, sustaining themselves on the flesh of birds. Captain Oliver, who commanded the Revenue cruiser Prince of Wales, visited Sula Sgeir in the month of August to look for the lost boat. He found the wreck of it, also an oar on end with an old pair of canvas trousers on it, and over the remains of a fire a pot containing birds' flesh; but there being no trace of the men, it was thought they must have been picked up by a passing vessel. Nothing more was heard of them until the month of October following, when a Russian vessel on her homeward voyage met a Stornoway craft in the Orkney Islands and informed the crew of the latter that they had taken the men off Sula Sgeir and landed them in Rona. Captain Oliver at once went to Rona, and found the crew consuming the last barrel of potatoes which the poor shepherd had. He took away the former and left the latter sufficient provision for the winter." Captain Benjamin Oliver commanded the vessel from 1811 until 1847.

"The last family which lived upon Rona was that of a shepherd named Donald M'Leod, otherwise the 'King of Rona,' who returned to Lewis in 1844." Sir James Matheson, who bought Lewis in 1844, offered the island to the Government for use as a penal settlement. The offer was refused.

Although farmers from Lewis have continued to graze sheep on Rona ever since, the island has remained uninhabited, apart from one brief and tragic episode in 1884–85. In June 1884, two men from Lewis, Malcolm MacDonald and Murdo Mackay, having reportedly had a dispute with the minister of their local church, went to stay on Rona to look after the sheep. In August, boatmen who had called at the island reported that the men were well and in good spirits, and had refused offers to take them back to Lewis. In April 1885, the next people to visit Rona found the two men had died during the winter.

During World War I, the commander of German U-boat U-90, Walter Remy, stopped his submarine at North Rona during each of his wartime patrols, weather permitting, and sent crewmen onto the island to shoot sheep to obtain mutton for on-board consumption.

The island was occupied temporarily in 1938–1939 by author and conservationist Frank Fraser Darling with his wife Bobbie and their son Alasdair, while they studied the grey seals and the breeding seabirds.

North Rona, with Sula Sgeir, historically formed part of the Barvas estate on Lewis, but a community buy-out of the estate in 2016 did not include the two islands, which would apparently have increased the purchase price by £80,000.

The island still boasts the Celtic ruins of St Ronan's Chapel. Together with Sula Sgeir, the island was formerly managed by Scottish Natural Heritage as a nature reserve, for its important grey seal and seabird colonies. These include the European storm-petrel and the larger Leach's storm-petrel, for which North Rona is an important breeding locality. It remains a protected area for nature and is a Site of Special Scientific Interest and a Special Protection Area.

In "Island at the edge of the world", the poet Kathleen Jamie describes a visit to the island, as well as in an essay in her collection Sightlines.

The island hosts an automatic light beacon, remotely monitored by the Northern Lighthouse Board.

See also

 List of islands in Scotland
 List of lighthouses in Scotland
 List of Northern Lighthouse Board lighthouses
 List of outlying islands of Scotland

Gallery

Footnotes

References

Modern sources

Pre-1900 sources
  - Contains information about Malcolm MacDonald and Murdoch Mackay.
 
 
 
  (Describes the swarm of rats on pages 24–5).

External links 

 BBC Radio 3 Feature on North Rona
 
 Joint Nature Conservation Committee - North Rona - Special Area of Conservation
 Royal Commission on the Ancient and Historical Monuments of Scotland - Information on the church and oratory
 Scotland's National Nature Reserves - Rona and Sula Sgeir
 Charles Tait Photographs of North Rona 
 Article in the Herald Scotland - 13 July 2002
 Northern Lighthouse Board

Uninhabited islands of the Outer Hebrides
Former populated places in Scotland
Seabird colonies
Archaeological sites in the Outer Hebrides
Important Bird Areas of Scotland
Protected areas of the Outer Hebrides